Wingate is an unincorporated community located in Perry County, Mississippi.

History
Wingate is located on the former Illinois Central Railroad. It was formerly home to a school, several stores, railroad stop, and two sawmills. The railroad station was closed in 1912.

A post office operated under the name Wingate from 1902 to 1926.

Notes

Unincorporated communities in Mississippi
Unincorporated communities in Perry County, Mississippi